SDCM can refer to:

 Standard deviation colour matching: see MacAdam ellipse 
 System for Differential Corrections and Monitoring, a Russian satellite navigation augmentation system
 Sete Povos Airfield, an airfield in Brazil with ICAO code SDCM